Dignagar is a village in the Krishnanagar I CD block in the Krishnanagar Sadar subdivision of the Nadia district, West Bengal, India.

History
It is an ancient village. According to the book Nadia Kahini written by renowned researcher Mohit Roy, it was a prosperous village from the period of Krishna Chandra Roy.

In 1673, Roy dug a big dighi and established three temples. It is a place where Lord Chaitanya came and from that time the people of the village observe a 3 days celebration with kirtan at 'Kalpataru Tala', where Lord Chaitanya sat for sometime with his followers.

নদিয়ারাজ-প্রতিষ্ঠাতা  ভবানন্দ  মজুমদারের  পৌত্র , কৃষ্ণচন্দ্রের  বৃদ্ধপ্রপিতামহ , রাজা  রাঘব  রায়  রাজত্বকালে   ১৬৩২ - ১৬৮৩  খ্রিষ্টাব্দ   মাটিয়ারী  থেকে  রেউই-এ  ( বর্তমান  কৃষ্ণনগর )  রাজধানী  স্থানান্তরিত  করার  পর,  কৃষ্ণনগর  থেকে   শান্তিপুর  পর্যন্ত  একটি  রাস্তা  তৈরি  করেন  এবং  জনসাধারণের  জলকষ্ট  নিবারণের  জন্য  ২০  হাজার  টাকা  ব্যয়ে  বর্তমান  দিগনগরে  এক  বিশাল  দিঘি  খনন  করেন।  দিঘি  বা  দীর্ঘিকা  থেকে  স্থানের  নাম  হয়  দীর্ঘিকানগর।  দিঘির  পূর্ব  দিকে  রাজা  রাঘব  একটি  সুন্দর  অট্টালিকা  ও  কাছাকাছি  দুটি  মন্দির  নির্মাণ  করেন।  একটি  মন্দির  বর্তমানে  বিধ্বস্ত।  অপরটি  এখনও  মোটামুটি  ভাল  অবস্থায়  আছে।  এটি  নদিয়া  জেলার  টেরাকোটা  মন্দিরগুলির  মধ্যে  অন্যতম।  মন্দিরে   ব্ল্যাক  বেসল্টের  তৈরী  'রাঘবেশ্বর'  শিবলিঙ্গ  নিত্য  পূজিত।  মন্দিরটি  একটি  উঁচু  ভিত্তি  বেদির  উপর  স্থাপিত।  বাংলা  চারচালা  রীতিতে  তৈরী  মন্দিরটিতে  দক্ষিণ,  পূর্ব  ও  পশ্চিম  দিকে  মোট  তিনটি  দরজা।  দরজার  দুপাশে  দুটি  করে  ছোট  ছোট  থাম  এবং  একটি  করে  কারুকার্য  করা  খিলান। 

   এই  মন্দিরে  টেরাকোটা  অলংকরণগুলির  আধিক্য  পশ্চিম  দেওয়ালে  ( উল্লেখ  করা  যেতে  পারে  যে  মন্দিরের  পশ্চিম  দিকে  রাস্তা ), তারপর  দক্ষিণ  দেওয়ালে।  পূর্ব  দিকের  দেওয়ালে  কিছু  ফুল  ছাড়া  অন্য  টেরাকোটা  নেই  এবং  দেওয়ালের  খিলানটিও  বর্তমানে  ভগ্ন।  উত্তর  দিকের  দেওয়াল  পলস্তারা  আবৃত।  ভিত্তিবেদি-সংলগ্ন  দুটি  অনুভূমিক  সারির  নিচের  সারিতে  টেরাকোটায়  জমিদার  বা  রাজার  শিবিকারোহণে  যাত্রা  এবং  সামনে-পিছনে  ঘোড়সওয়ার  ও  লোকলস্কর,  অশ্বারোহী  শিকারী,  খোল-করতাল  সহযোগে  হরিনাম  সংকীর্তন,  হাতির  পিঠে  সওয়ার,  মিথুনদৃশ্য,  গড়গড়ায়  তামাক  সেবন  প্রভৃতি  সমাজচিত্র   উৎকীর্ণ  আছে

উপরের  সারিতে  একটানা  হংস পংক্তির  দৃশ্য।  পশ্চিম  দিকের  প্রবেশ  পথের  খিলানের  ওপরের  চারপাশে  আটচালা  প্রতীক   শিবালয়  ও  তারমধ্যে  শিবলিঙ্গ।  লক্ষণীয়  হল,  দক্ষিণদিকের  দেওয়ালে  দ্বারপথের  খিলানের  ওপরের   চারপাশে   আটচালা  প্রতীক  মন্দিরের  মধ্যে  মাত্র  দুটি  শিবলিঙ্গ  বাকি  সব  মুসলমান  যোদ্ধা।  প্রবেশ  পথের  উপরে  ও  দুপাশে  কুলঙ্গিতে  নিবদ্ধ  দুই  সারি  মূর্তির  মধ্যে  দশাবতার,  কৃষ্ণলীলার  বিভিন্ন  দৃশ্য  যথা  কৃষ্ণরাধিকা, বস্ত্রহরণ,  কালীয়দমন  প্রভৃতিই  প্রধান।  এছাড়া  রাম, বলরাম,  বৃষবাহন  শিব,  প্রহরী,  সৈনিক,  সন্ন্যাসী  প্রভৃতি  মূর্তির  সমারোহ।  একটি  ফলকে  ডানপায়ের  ওপর  বাঁ  পা  রেখে  দণ্ডায়মান  এক  নারীমূর্তি।  তার  পাশে  একটি  হরিণশিশু।  যার  পোশাকি  নাম  'শালভঞ্জিকা'।  এ  মন্দিরে  বিশেষত্ব  হল,  প্রচুর  উৎকৃষ্ট  নকশি  কাজ,  যা  নদিয়ার  খুব  কম  মন্দিরেই  দেখা  যায়।  মন্দিরের  পোড়ামাটির  মূর্তিগুলির  সুক্ষ্ম  কাজ  এই  শতকে  নির্মিত  ভাস্কর্যকলার  বৈশিষ্ট  বহন  করে।  আরেকটি  উল্লেখযোগ্য  হল,  প্রবেশপথের  নিচে  চৌকাঠ  হিসাবে  মোটা  ও  ভারী  কাল  পাথরের  ব্যবহার।  বর্তমানে  মন্দিরটি  পশ্চিমবঙ্গ  সরকার  কর্তৃক  সংরক্ষিত। 

মন্দিরটি  একটি  উঁচু  ভিত্তি  বেদির  উপর  স্থাপিত।  বাংলা  চারচালা  রীতিতে  তৈরী  মন্দিরটিতে  দক্ষিণ,  পূর্ব  ও  পশ্চিম  দিকে  মোট  তিনটি  দরজা।  দরজার  দুপাশে  দুটি  করে  ছোট  ছোট  থাম  এবং  একটি  করে  কারুকার্য  করা  খিলান। 

দিগনগরে  যেতে  হলে  শিয়ালদহ  থেকে  লালগোলা  প্যাসেঞ্জার  বা  কৃষ্ণনগর  লোকালে  উঠুন।  নামুন  কৃষ্ণনগরে।  স্টেশন  থেকে  বাসে  বা  রিকশায়  বাসস্ট্যাণ্ডে  পৌঁছান।  সেখান  থেকে  শান্তিপুরগামী  বাসে  পৌঁছে  যান  দিগনগরে।  স্টপেজ  থেকে  পশ্চিম  দিকে  কিছুটা  হাঁটলে  পৌঁছে  যাবেন  মন্দিরে।

Geography

Demographics
According to the 2011 Census of India, Dignagar had a total population of 6,023, of which 3,097 (51%) were males and 2,926 (49%) were females. Population in the age range 0-6 years was 538. The total number of literate persons in Dignagar was 3,767 (68.68% of the population over 6 years).

Culture
David J. McCutchion mentions several temples at Dignagar:
 Small 18th century Shiva temple with terracotta decoration
 Richly decorated charchala
 Raghabeswara temple (1669) – charchala structure with rich terracotta decoration on two sides
 Mahaprabhu temple

References

Villages in Nadia district